Progress 34 was a Soviet uncrewed Progress cargo spacecraft, which was launched in January 1988 to resupply the Mir space station.

Launch
Progress 34 launched on 20 January 1988 from the Baikonur Cosmodrome in the Kazakh SSR. It used a Soyuz-U2 rocket.

Docking
Progress 34 docked with the aft port of the Kvant-1 module of Mir on 23 January 1988 at 00:09:09 UTC, and was undocked on 4 March 1988 at 03:40:09 UTC.

Decay
It remained in orbit until 4 March 1988, when it was deorbited. The deorbit burn occurred at 06:45:00 UTC and the mission ended at 07:29:30 UTC.

See also

 1988 in spaceflight
 List of Progress missions
 List of uncrewed spaceflights to Mir

References

Progress (spacecraft) missions
1988 in the Soviet Union
Spacecraft launched in 1988
Spacecraft which reentered in 1988
Spacecraft launched by Soyuz-U rockets